Mark Brennan Rosenberg is an openly gay author and comedian based in New York City.  He is the author of two books: Blackouts and Breakdowns - released on August 24, 2011, and Eating My Feelings: Tales of Overeating, Underperforming, and Coping with My Crazy Family - released on August 6, 2013 through Crown Publishing. Rosenberg's writings and commentary focus on the issues that affect the lesbian, gay, bisexual, and transgender community; particularly alcohol addiction and substance abuse, which he discusses heavily in his first book. Rosenberg has been sober since 2008. He is currently a contributor for The Huffington Post. Rosenberg toured the country promoting his first book Blackouts and Breakdowns in 2012, and again promoting his second book, Eating My Feelings, in late 2013. Rosenberg's first novel This Made Me Think of You was released on April 5, 2016. It follows a couple's breakup over the course of a year solely through their social media, text and email exchanges.

References

21st-century American comedians
Gay comedians
American gay writers
Living people
Place of birth missing (living people)
Year of birth missing (living people)